2-Methoxyamphetamine (2-MA), also known as ortho-methoxyamphetamine (OMA), is a drug of the amphetamine class. It is substantially weaker in inhibiting the reuptake of and inducing the release of the monoamine neurotransmitters compared to related agents such as amphetamine, MMA, and PMA, and may instead act as a β-adrenergic receptor agonist similarly to its N-methylated analogue methoxyphenamine.

See also 
 Methoxyphenamine
 3-Methoxyamphetamine (MMA)
 4-Methoxyamphetamine (PMA)

References

External links 
 IsomerDesign - OMA; 2-Methoxyamphetamine

Phenethylamines